American R&B singer-songwriter R. Kelly has released 18 studio albums, five compilation albums, one soundtrack album, six video albums, one mixtape, two extended play, and 129 singles (including 47 as a featured artist and 10 promotional singles).

Albums

Studio albums

Compilation albums

Soundtrack albums

Video albums

Mixtapes

Singles

As lead artist

As featured artist

Promotional singles

Other charting songs

Guest appearances

Filmography

Television

Notes

References

External links
 Official website
 
 
 

Discographies of American artists
Rhythm and blues discographies
Pop music discographies
Discography
Soul music discographies